The Convention of Calcutta or Anglo-Chinese Convention of 1890, officially the Convention Between Great Britain and China Relating to Sikkim and Tibet, was a treaty between Britain and Qing China relating to Tibet and the Kingdom of Sikkim. It was signed by Viceroy of India Lord Lansdowne and the Chinese Amban in Tibet, Sheng Tai, on 17March 1890 in Calcutta, India.
The Convention recognized a British protectorate over Sikkim and demarcated the Sikkim–Tibet border.

China is said to have negotiated the treaty without consulting Tibet, and the Tibetans refused to recognize it. China's inability to deliver on the treaty eventually necessitated a British expedition to Tibet in 1904, setting in motion a long chain of developments  in the history of Tibet. Modern international law jurists state that the convention exposed the Chinese 'impotence' in Tibet.

The boundary established between Sikkim and Tibet in the treaty still survives today, as part of the China–India border. It has an impact on the modern day Doklam dispute between China, India and Bhutan.

Background
The British imperative in North East India was to open the markets of Tibet and by extension China to their manufactured textiles, tobacco, grain, tools and tea.

Provisions
Under Article 1, the boundary of Sikkim and Tibet was defined as the crest of the mountain range separating the waters flowing into the Teesta River in Sikkim and its tributaries from the waters flowing into the Tibetan Mochu River and northwards into other rivers of Tibet. The line commenced at Mount Gipmochi on the Bhutan frontier, and followed the above watershed  to the point where it met Nepali territory.

Aftermath
A protocol was added to the original convention in December 1893. "Regulations Regarding Trade, Communications, and Pasturage to Be Appended to the Sikkim-Tibet Convention of 1890" allowed for the establishment of a British trading post in Old Yatung, Tibet as well as laid down regulations concerning pasturage and communication.

The 1904 Convention of Lhasa states "The Government of Thibet engages to respect the Anglo-Chinese Convention of 1890 and to recognize the frontier between Sikkim and Thibet, as defined in Article I of the said Convention, and to erect boundary pillars accordingly."

References

Bibliography

External links 

 
 
 

Treaties of the United Kingdom (1801–1922)
Treaties of the Qing dynasty
Treaties of Sikkim